Arthrotardigrada are an order of tardigrades, first described by Marcus in 1927.

Families 
Arthrotardigrada consists of the following families:

 Anisonychidae
 Archechiniscidae
 Batillipedidae
 Coronarctidae
 Halechiniscidae
 Neoarctidae
 Neostygarctidae
 Renaudarctidae
 Stygarctidae
 Styraconyxidae
 Tanarctidae

References

Further reading 
 Marcus (1927), Zur Anatomie und Ökologie mariner Tardigraden. (On Anatomy and Oecology of Underwater Tardigrades) Zoologische Jahrbücher, Abteilung für Systematik, vol. 53, p. 487–558.

External links 
 

 
Protostome orders